Ponderosa Park may refer to:
Ponderosa Park, Colorado
Ponderosa Park, Arizona